Jerome J. Workman Jr. is an American analytical spectroscopist, author, and editor born on August 6, 1952, in Northfield, Minnesota. Jerry Workman Jr. and J.J. Workman are also names he uses for publishing.

Education
Workman studied at Saint John's University (Minnesota) and Saint Mary's University of Minnesota, earning a B.A. (cum laude) and an M.A. While at St. John's Workman played rugby and was co-captain of the wrestling team where he was twice Minnesota Intercollegiate Athletic Conference (MIAC) Champion (1971,1974), and was also a National Catholic Intercollegiate Tournament (NCIT) Champion and was voted Outstanding Wrestler of the NCIT Tournament  in 1972. As a student at St. Mary's University of Minnesota, he was the head wrestling coach from 1976 to 1978. He went on to earn his Ph.D. at Columbia Pacific University. Later, he entered the Columbia Executive Program at the Columbia Business School, completing the Columbia Senior Executive Program, the Certificate in Business Excellence, and the Certificate of Executive Development. At MIT Sloan School of Management he did further studies for a Certificate in Strategy and Innovation.

Career
Workman has published multiple reference text volumes, including the three-volume Academic Press Handbook of Organic Compounds, and five-volume The Concise Handbook of Analytical Spectroscopy. He has received the Williams–Wright Award, the ASTM International Award of Merit, the Eastern Analytical Symposium Award, and the New York Society for Applied Spectroscopy Gold Medal Award for his considerable volume of publications, reviews, and books. He, along with co-author Howard L. Mark, have published over 150 successive columns on statistics and chemometrics for Spectroscopy Magazine since 1986.

Workman has held appointments with the U.S. National Academies NRC panel for Assessment of NIST Programs from 2005 to 2007 and was given the U.S. Department of Commerce Certificate of Appreciation in 2007. He has served as executive editor (editor-in-chief) of Spectroscopy Letters, appointed 1999–2003; associate editor, Applied Spectroscopy Reviews (New York), appointed 1999–2004; editorial advisory board, and Spectroscopy Magazine (Oregon) since 1995 in addition to many others appointments. He was a Charter Member of U.S. Food and Drug Administration PAT and Chemometrics Committee in 2002.  Workman has also served on numerous chemical and scientific advisory boards. Workman is also the holder of numerous patents. Contributed to research and development for multiple commercial instruments and algorithms for laboratory,  process, and clinical monitoring.

Additional sources
 Williams–Wright Award Announcement
 Chemical & Engineering News announces Pittcon Research Awards 2009
 ASTM International News
MIT Technology Review Blue is for Biohazard
J. Workman Publications

References

1952 births
Living people
Writers from Minnesota
People from Northfield, Minnesota
American science writers
21st-century American chemists
Saint Mary's University of Minnesota alumni
College of Saint Benedict and Saint John's University alumni
Columbia Business School alumni